The Ozark Trail is a hiking, backpacking, and, in many places, biking and equestrian trail under construction in the Missouri Ozarks in the United States.  It is intended to reach from St. Louis to Arkansas.  Over  of the trail have been completed as of 2008, and the estimated length when finished will be at least .  When joined to the Ozark Highlands Trail in Arkansas, the full hiking distance from end to end will be at least , not including a large loop through the St. Francois Mountains in Missouri.

Description 
The trail is currently composed of thirteen sections, most of which are joined to other sections, though some gaps exist. The exact routes for incomplete sections have not been established, so the total length of the trail when completed remains undetermined.

Some sections have restrictions on their use in order to be compatible with the goals and purposes of the various public and private landholders whose property the trail crosses.  Horseback riding, mountain biking, or trail side camping may be restricted in certain environmentally sensitive areas.

Development 
The Ozark Trail had its beginnings in the 1970s when a group of public land managers, land owners, and trail users met to discuss the concept of a long-distance hiking trail. It was determined that a trail spanning the Ozarks from suburban St. Louis southwest to Arkansas could be routed over mostly existing public lands with a minimum amount of right-of-way needing to be obtained from private landowners. A first meeting in 1976 at Meramec State Park lead to the first draft of the trails proposal in February 1977 and in 1981 the first sections of the trail were under construction.

The general route of the Ozark Trail is determined by the Ozark Trail Council, which was formed by seven governmental agencies including the National Forest Service, the Missouri State Parks Department, the Missouri Conservation Commission, et al., plus several environmental groups and a private landowner with significant holdings.  The land manager for each parcel held by these constituents is responsible for the trail within its holdings.

As the route over contiguous public lands is completed further progress will likely be slowed by the arduous process of acquiring private land and easements.

Volunteers formed the Ozark Trail Association in 2002 to work with the Ozark Trail Council to develop and maintain the Ozark Trail.  The Ozark Trail was designated a National Recreation Trail in 2008

Damage

Taum Sauk reservoir failure 
The upper reservoir of the Taum Sauk pumped storage plant failed in December 2005, causing a flood that devastated Johnson's Shut-ins State Park and destroyed a part of the Taum Sauk section of the Ozark Trail at the shut-ins.  The Ozark Trail Association and the Missouri Department of Natural Resources mapped out a new route to replace the damaged section, which was completed in mid-2009.

May 2009 storms 
An unusually strong May 2009 windstorm devastated 44 miles of the trail within the Mark Twain National Forest, and all or parts of several sections of the Ozark Trail were closed because of downed trees.  Within months several sections were repaired and reopened through the work of both volunteer and paid forest service crews.
  All access was eventually restored, though as of May, 2013, conditions on some sections of trail may be of concern to bikers or to those on horseback.

See also

The trail crosses parts of these public lands:
 Eleven Point National Wild and Scenic River
 Johnson's Shut-ins State Park
 Mark Twain National Forest
 Onondaga Cave State Park
 Ozark National Scenic Riverways
 Roger Pryor Pioneer Backcountry
 Sam A. Baker State Park
 Taum Sauk Mountain State Park
 Bell Mountain Wilderness Area
 Devils Backbone Wilderness Area
 Numerous holdings of the Missouri Department of Conservation

Notes

External links
Ozark Trail Association
Missouri Department of Natural Resources
Mark Twain National Forest trails, including the Ozark Trail.

Trail
Hiking trails in Missouri
Protected areas of the U.S. Interior Highlands
Protected areas of Butler County, Missouri
Protected areas of Carter County, Missouri
Protected areas of Crawford County, Missouri
Protected areas of Douglas County, Missouri
Protected areas of Howell County, Missouri
Protected areas of Iron County, Missouri
Long-distance trails in the United States
Protected areas of Madison County, Missouri
Protected areas of Oregon County, Missouri
Protected areas of Ozark County, Missouri
Protected areas of Reynolds County, Missouri
Protected areas of Shannon County, Missouri
Protected areas of Washington County, Missouri
Protected areas of Wayne County, Missouri
National Recreation Trails in Missouri